Burd is a surname. Notable people with the surname include:

David Burd (born 1988), American rapper and comedian known professionally as Lil Dicky
Edward Burd (1749–1833), American Revolutionary War officer, lawyer and chief court clerk of the Pennsylvania Supreme Court
George Burd (1793–1844), member of the U.S. House of Representatives from Pennsylvania
James Burd (1726–1793), colonial American soldier in the French and Indian War; father of Edward Burd
James M. Burd (1931-2013), member of the Pennsylvania House of Representatives
Lettie Cowman, née Burd (1870-1960), American writer and cofounder of the Oriental Missionary Society 
Steven Burd (born 1949), president and chief executive officer of Safeway Inc.
Walter Burd (1888-1939), Anglican Bishop of Saskatchewan, Canada

Fictional characters:
Burd Ellen, in two unrelated works: the ballad Burd Ellen and Young Tamlane and the fairy tale "Childe Rowland"

See also
Bashar ibn Burd (714-784), Persian poet
Bürd, Övörkhangai, a district in Mongolia
Cape Burd, Antarctica
Redstone Old Fort, built in 1759 by Colonel James Burd and briefly named Fort Burd
Bird (disambiguation)
Byrd (disambiguation)